Kristián Kudroč (born May 21, 1981) is a Slovak former professional ice hockey defenceman.

Playing career
Kudroč was drafted by the New York Islanders as their first-round pick, 28th overall, in the 1999 NHL Entry Draft. He is a large, physical defenceman with an impressive slapshot. He played in North America from 1999 to 2005, and represented SaiPa in the Finnish SM-liiga in the 2005–06 season, where SaiPafanit (the SaiPa fan club) elected Kudroč Player of the Year.

Kudroc suffered a pre-season injury in a Tournament game with Barys Astana prior to the 2014–15 season. Kudroc was ruled out for the duration of the season in order to rehabilitate. As a free agent, Kudroc moved on from Astana and signed a one-year contract with Metallurg Novokuznetsk on June 4, 2015. On August 17, 2015, Kudroc sought a release from his contract with Metallurg due to personal reasons. He returned to Czech Republic, signing a contract after a years hiatus with HC Plzeň of the Extraliga on December 14, 2015.

On July 14, 2016, Kudroc agreed to a one-year contract as a free agent to move to Austria, with EBEL club HC TWK Innsbruck. He featured in 8 games with Innsbruck before on November 6, 2016, he moved to the UK to sign for Nottingham Panthers of the EIHL. However, in December 2016, after playing in another 8 games, Kudroc again ceased his playing contract with Nottingham, departing for personal reasons relating to a serious illness within his family in his native Slovakia.

Career statistics

Regular season and playoffs

International

References

External links

1981 births
Living people
Ässät players
Barys Nur-Sultan players
Brynäs IF players
Detroit Vipers players
Florida Panthers players
Frölunda HC players
Hammarby Hockey (1921–2008) players
HC Sibir Novosibirsk players
HC TWK Innsbruck players
Ilves players
National Hockey League first-round draft picks
New York Islanders draft picks
People from Michalovce
Sportspeople from the Košice Region
Philadelphia Phantoms players
Nottingham Panthers players
HC Plzeň players
Quebec RadioX players
Quebec Remparts players
SaiPa players
San Antonio Rampage players
Slovak expatriate ice hockey players in the United States
Slovak ice hockey defencemen
Södertälje SK players
Springfield Falcons players
Tampa Bay Lightning players
Expatriate ice hockey players in England
Expatriate ice hockey players in Austria
Slovak expatriate sportspeople in England
Slovak expatriate sportspeople in Austria
Slovak expatriate ice hockey players in Finland
Slovak expatriate ice hockey players in Sweden
Slovak expatriate ice hockey players in Russia
Slovak expatriate ice hockey players in Canada
Slovak expatriate sportspeople in Kazakhstan
Expatriate ice hockey players in Kazakhstan